The 1978 Scottish Cup Final was played on 6 May 1978 at Hampden Park in Glasgow and was the final of the 93rd Scottish Cup. Aberdeen and Rangers contested the match, Rangers won the match 2–1 with a flying header from Alex MacDonald and a second from Derek Johnstone in the second half.

Match details

References

See also
 Aberdeen F.C.–Rangers F.C. rivalry

1978
Cup Final
Rangers F.C. matches
Aberdeen F.C. matches
1970s in Glasgow
May 1978 sports events in the United Kingdom